Dan in Real Life is a 2007 American comedy drama film directed by Peter Hedges, and stars Steve Carell, Alison Pill, Juliette Binoche, Dianne Wiest, John Mahoney and Dane Cook.

This is the first Touchstone Pictures film to be distributed by Walt Disney Studios Motion Pictures after Disney retired the Buena Vista brand from its distribution division.

Plot 
Dan Burns is a newspaper advice columnist, widower, and single-parent to his three daughters, living in North Jersey. The family takes a trip to the oceanside Rhode Island home of his parents for an annual family gathering. Also in attendance are Dan's brother and sister with their families, along with Dan's younger brother Mitch, who is known for his carefree lifestyle.

The morning after their arrival, Dan meets Marie in a bookshop. They share a muffin and a heart-felt conversation, although she gently warns him that she has a new boyfriend. 

Dan returns to his parents' house and announces that he has "met someone", whereupon the whole family encourages him to 'go for it'. Later, at the house, Mitch introduces his new girlfriend, who turns out to be Marie. Dan is disheartened and resists his father's relationship advice about finding someone of his own.

Dan reluctantly agrees to a double date with their once unattractive childhood friend, Ruthie "Pig Face" Draper. Marie jealously watches him and Ruthie. The next morning, Dan endures her 'silent treatment punishment' for his late night with Ruthie by eating the burnt pancakes that she serves him. Tension grows between Dan and Marie, culminating at the family talent show, from which Dan has been excused from by the family. 

Mitch has Dan accompany him on the guitar as he sings, "Let My Love Open the Door".  During the bridge, Dan begins to sing as well, seemingly to Marie. The next morning outside at her car, Marie breaks up with Mitch and drives away. 

However, she soon calls, later having made their way through pouring rain in their cars, Marie and Dan meet at a bowling alley to talk. The meeting evolves into a date and finally a passionate kiss, interrupted when Dan's entire family arrives to bowl. Mitch punches Dan in the face and Marie hurries out. Meanwhile, Dan's middle daughter, Cara, grows more frustrated because of his meddling in her relationship with her boyfriend, Marty, whom she earnestly professes to Dan that she 'loves'.

After the bowling alley fiasco, Dan's three daughters angrily turn on him. Later Dan reconciles with them and they travel together to New York City, where they finally find Marie at her gym. As he makes eye contact with her, Dan, in voice-over, tells the readers of his advice column that instead of merely planning ahead in life, they should "plan to be surprised."

The film ends with Dan and Marie celebrating their wedding at his parents' Rhode Island home; Mitch happily dancing with Ruthie and Cara happily dancing with Marty, whom Dan has now accepted.

Cast

Release 
The film opened October 26, 2007, in the United States and Canada and grossed $11.8 million in 1,921 theaters its opening weekend, ranking #2 at the box office. , it has grossed $68,377,859. It is the first Touchstone movie to be released under the Walt Disney Studios Motion Pictures name following the retirement of the previous Buena Vista Pictures Distribution.

It was released on DVD and Blu-ray on March 11, 2008.

Production 
The opening scene was in New Jersey and then Rhode Island in the cities of Newport, East Greenwich, West Greenwich, Jamestown, Westerly, and Providence in November and December 2006. The opening scene was filmed at Seven Stars Bakery in Providence. However, the facade of the building and the interior are altered. The first time Dan is pulled over by the Jamestown, Rhode Island police, he is on Ocean Avenue in Newport, Rhode Island. The second time, Dan is pulled over by Mackerel Cove in Jamestown. In scenes filmed in Jamestown, two bridges are clearly visible: the Jamestown Bridge and its replacement, the Jamestown Verrazzano Bridge. Demolition of the Jamestown Bridge was initiated on April 18, 2006. The film also cast local residents of neighboring towns and cities consisting of Middletown, North Kingstown and North Providence as Dan's nieces and nephews. The date scene was filmed in two different places in Westerly. The inside shots were filmed at Alley Katz Bowling Center, while the exterior shots were filmed at Misquamicut Beach. What is now the Windjammer was dressed to look like the outside of the bowling center. The sunset scene with the entire family on the beach was filmed at Napatree Point in Westerly.

Soundtrack 
Norwegian singer-songwriter Sondre Lerche composed the majority of the music in the film, and has a cameo appearance in a scene at the end.

Full soundtrack listing:

 "Family Theme Waltz" - Sondre Lerche
 "To Be Surprised" - Lerche
 "I'll Be OK" - Lerche
 "Dan and Marie Picking Hum" - Lerche
 "My Hands Are Shaking" - Lerche
 "Dan in Real Life" - Lerche
 "Hell No" - Lerche and Regina Spektor
 "Family Theme" - Lerche
 "Fever" - A Fine Frenzy
 "Airport Taxi Reception" - Lerche and The Faces Down Quartet
 "Dan and Marie Melody" - Lerche
 "Human Hands" - Lerche and The Faces Down Quartet
 "I'll Be OK" (Instrumental Reprise) - Lerche
 "Let My Love Open the Door" - Pete Townshend
 "Dan and Marie Finale Theme" - Lerche
 "Modern Nature" - Lerche and Lillian Samdal
 "Ruthie Pigface Draper" (bonus track) - Dane Cook and Norbert Leo Butz, taken from a scene in the movie

"Mr. Blue Sky" by the Electric Light Orchestra is featured in the TV and radio advertisements for the movie, as well as "Let My Love Open the Door" by Pete Townshend and "Henrietta" by The Fratellis. The club mix of Inaya Day's "Nasty Girl (Vanity 6 song)" and Earth, Wind & Fire's "September '99 (Phats & Small Remix)" are also featured in separate scenes in the movie but are not on the soundtrack. "Human Hands" written by Elvis Costello (the original version appears on his album Imperial Bedroom).

Reception 
On review aggregator Rotten Tomatoes, the film holds an approval rating of 65% based on 170 reviews, with an average rating of 6.2/10. The website's critical consensus reads, "The fine performances elevate Dan in Real Life beyond its sentimental plot." On Metacritic, the film has a weighted average score of 65 out of 100, based on 34 critics, indicating "generally favorable reviews." Audiences polled by CinemaScore gave the film an average grade of "B+" on an A+ to F scale.

Some critics described it as a non-holiday holiday film that is derived from that genre and the rom-com genre in general. A. O. Scott of The New York Times wrote "not to expect too much from Dan in Real Life that way you can be pleasantly surprised" but did while drawing attention to characterization questions regarding the female roles.

References

External links 

 
 
 
 
 
 Dan in Real Life DVD and Blu-ray official site

2007 films
Films set in Rhode Island
Touchstone Pictures films
Focus Features films
Icon Productions films
2007 comedy-drama films
Films shot in Rhode Island
American comedy-drama films
Films about writers
Films set in bookstores
Films set in New Jersey
Films about families
Films about father–daughter relationships
2000s English-language films
2000s American films